Chipman Creek is a stream in Alberta, Canada.

Chipman Creek has the name of J. E. Chipman, a cattleman.

See also
List of rivers of Alberta

References

Rivers of Alberta